The New Zealand National Time Trial Championship is a road bicycle race that takes place inside the New Zealand National Cycling Championship, and decides the best cyclist in this type of race. The first edition took place in 1995. The first race winner of the road race championship was Brian Fowler. The record for the most wins in the men's championship is held by Gordon McCauley (3). The current men's champion is Regan Gough. The women's record is held by Melissa Holt with 5 wins.

Multiple winners

Men

Women

Men

Elite

U23

Women

Elite

The following elite women have gained podium places.

U23

References

External links
 Under 23 men's winners from 1997 on cyclingarchives.com
 Men's winners from 1995 on cyclingarchives.com

National road cycling championships
Cycle races in New Zealand
Recurring sporting events established in 1995
1995 establishments in New Zealand
Time Trial